Edward Hayes Pickering (21 May 1807 – 19 May 1852) was an English cricketer with amateur status. He was associated with several clubs and made his first-class debut in 1827. He was educated at Eton and Trinity College, Cambridge. After graduating he was a fellow of St John's College, Cambridge, 1830–33. He was ordained as a Church of England priest and was an assistant master at Eton College from 1830 until his death.

References

1807 births
1852 deaths
English cricketers
English cricketers of 1826 to 1863
Cambridge University cricketers
Gentlemen cricketers
Surrey cricketers
Marylebone Cricket Club cricketers
Non-international England cricketers
People educated at Eton College
Alumni of Trinity College, Cambridge
Fellows of St John's College, Cambridge
19th-century English Anglican priests
Gentlemen of Sussex cricketers